Vinton Hayworth (June 4, 1906 – May 21, 1970),  also known as Jack Arnold and Vincent Haworth, was an American actor, playwright and screenwriter who began in weaselly and milquetoast roles and aged into dignified character parts. He appeared in over 90 films during his career, as well as on numerous television shows. Later audiences will recognize him from his final role as General Winfield Schaeffer in the fourth and fifth seasons of the sitcom I Dream of Jeannie. He was the uncle of Rita Hayworth, as well as being the uncle (by marriage) of Ginger Rogers.

Career
Born in Washington, D.C., Hayworth began acting in his late teens. He was a pioneering radio announcer in the early 1920s, first in Washington, later in New York City, and then in Chicago. Subsequently, he appeared on numerous radio programs in various roles. He played Fred Andrews on Archie Andrews, was an announcer on Chaplain Jim, played Philip Roberts on It's Higgins, Sir, played Port on Lone Journey, played Alonzo Smith on Meet Me in St. Louis, and portrayed Jack Arnold on Myrt and Marge.

By 1933 he began to perform in films, still under the stage name Jack Arnold. He initially appeared on screen in small roles, often as comically good-natured, sneaky characters. He did, though, occasionally have larger parts, such costarring with Constance Worth and Leslie Fenton in China Passage (1937), a production in which he is billed as Vinton Haworth. His appearances credited as Jack Arnold ended in the early 1940s, and he did a two-year stint on Broadway from 1942 to 1944 before returning to California, where he continued to work in films into the 1960s. 

Hayworth was also one of the founders of AFRA (later AFTRA), the union representing radio and television artists, of which he was also the president from 1951–54.

Hayworth began to perform increasingly on television in the 1950s. In 1953–1954, he was an announcer on The Buick-Berle Show on NBC. He also appeared in a variety of roles on Alfred Hitchcock Presents, Gunsmoke, Perry Mason, Dennis the Menace (as Mr. Cramer in 1960 episode "Out of Retirement"), Petticoat Junction, Ripcord, Hazel (6 episodes), The Munsters, Green Acres (1965) and Dick Tracy (1967). He played Magistrado Carlos Galindo on Disney's Zorro (1957–1959). His final role was as General Winfield Schaeffer on I Dream of Jeannie between 1969 and 1970. Hayworth replaced Barton MacLane, who had played General Martin Peterson until his death in 1969. Coincidentally, both Hayworth and MacLane died before the final episodes in which they appeared had been broadcast.

Death
Hayworth died of a heart attack on May 21, 1970 at the age of 63, shortly after completing his recurring role of General Winfield Schaeffer in I Dream of Jeannie.

Personal
Hayworth was married to actress Jean Owens, whose sister was Lela Emogene Owens, mother of actress Ginger Rogers. Another sister-in-law, Verda Virginia Clendenin (née Owens; formerly Brown Nichols), was the mother of actress Phyllis Fraser.

Hayworth's elder sister was Volga Hayworth, mother of screen star Rita Hayworth, making Vinton Hayworth maternal uncle of Rita Hayworth and uncle by marriage of Ginger Rogers and Phyllis Fraser.

Partial filmography

 Enlighten Thy Daughter (1934) – Stanley Jordan
 Without Orders (1936) – Len Kendrick
 Night Waitress (1936) – George Skinner
 That Girl from Paris (1936) – Reporter (uncredited)
 We're on the Jury (1937) – Mr. M. Williams – Defense Attorney
 Sea Devils (1937) – Defense Counsel (uncredited)
 China Passage (1937) – Tommy Baldwin
 You Can't Buy Luck (1937) – Paul Vinette
 Riding on Air (1937) – Harvey Schumann
 Danger Patrol (1937) – Ed
 Hitting a New High (1937) – Carter Haig
 This Marriage Business (1938) – Attorney Lloyd Wilson
 Law of the Underworld(1938) – Eddie
 Vivacious Lady (1938) – Druggist (uncredited)
 Blind Alibi (1938) – Dirk
 Crime Ring (1938) – Buzzell
 Carefree (1938) – Elevator Operator (uncredited)
 Fugitives for a Night (1938) – Barrington (uncredited)
 Mr. Doodle Kicks Off (1938) – Henchman (uncredited)
 The Mad Miss Manton (1938) – Peter's Secretary (uncredited)
 A Man to Remember (1938) – Huber (uncredited)
 Tarnished Angel (1938) – Dan 'Dandy' Bennett
 Fixer Dugan (1939) – Frank Darlow
 When Tomorrow Comes (1939) – Radio Technician (uncredited)
 The Day the Bookies Wept (1939) – Harry, Rider with Margie
 Sued for Libel (1939) – Dr. James L. Bailer
 That's Right – You're Wrong (1939) – Producer (uncredited)
 Oh Johnny, How You Can Love (1940) – The Chaser
 Danger on Wheels (1940) – Bruce Crowley
 Framed (1940) – Nick
 Enemy Agent (1940) – Lester Taylor
 Love, Honor, and Oh Baby! (1940) – Man with Susan
 Cross-Country Romance (1940) – Dist. Atty. J. Holmby (uncredited)
 Millionaires in Prison (1940) – 'Windy' Windsor
 Margie (1940) – Young Man (uncredited)
 Argentine Nights (1940) – Ship Officer (uncredited)
 Mexican Spitfire Out West (1940) – Mr. Brown (uncredited)
 Lucky Devils (1941) – Bradford
 The Saint in Palm Springs (1941) – Charlie – Desk Clerk (uncredited)
 Tight Shoes (1941) – Reporter (uncredited)
 Tillie the Toiler (1941) – Wally Whipple
 The Stork Pays Off (1941) – Todd Perry (uncredited)
 New York Town (1941) – Gentleman on Boat (uncredited)
 The Mexican Spitfire's Baby (1941) – Rudolph – the Hotel Clerk
 Two-Faced Woman (1941) – Guide (uncredited)
 Playmates (1941) – Radio Commentator (uncredited)
 To the Shores of Tripoli (1942) – Officer at Dance (uncredited)
 Juke Box Jenny (1942) – Brother Childs
 Junior G-Men of the Air (1942) – Flyer [Ch. 2] (uncredited)
 Spy Smasher (1942) – Camera Shop Clerk [Ch. 6] (uncredited)
 Saboteur (1942) – Will – Other Man in Movie (uncredited)
 You're Telling Me (1942) – Announcer (uncredited)
 There's One Born Every Minute (1942) – Photographer (uncredited)
 The Pride of the Yankees (1942) – Fraternity Boy (uncredited)
 Mexican Spitfire's Elephant (1942) – Parks, Hotel Regal Manager (uncredited)
 The Mummy's Tomb (1942) – Frank, Reporter (uncredited)
 Behind the Eight Ball (1942) – Bobby Leonard
 The Powers Girl (1943) – Announcer at Annual Preview (uncredited)
 It Comes Up Love (1943) – Photographer (uncredited)
 It Ain't Hay (1943) – Golfer (uncredited)
 Ladies' Day (1943) – Movie Director (uncredited)
 Backfire (1950) – Waiter (uncredited)
 The Girl He Left Behind (1956) – Arthur Shaeffer
 The Great Man (1956) – Charley Carruthers
 Spartacus (1960) – Metallius (uncredited)
 Police Dog Story (1961) – Harley A. Crenshaw – Police Commissioner
 Youngblood Hawke (1964) – Urban Webber (uncredited)
 Quick, Let's Get Married (1964) – Aguesta, Town Banker
 Chamber of Horrors (1966) – Judge Walter Randolph

Notes

References

External links
 
 Vinton Hayworth 1958 Buick commercial – YouTube video

American male film actors
American male stage actors
American male television actors
1906 births
1970 deaths
Male actors from Washington, D.C.
American male radio actors
20th-century American male actors